Eygló Ósk Gústafsdóttir is an Icelandic swimmer. She competed at the 2012 Summer Olympics in the women's 100 metre backstroke, finishing 2nd in her heat but in 32nd place overall in the heats, failing to qualify for the semifinals.

On 30 March 2015 Eygló Ósk swam the 200 m backstroke in 2:09.86 minutes, setting new Icelandic and Nordic records; the previous Icelandic record was 2:10.34, set by her herself, while the old Nordic record was 2:10.27. Her time was also below the maximum required to qualify for the 2016 Summer Olympics in Brazil, which is 2:10.60.

At the Olympics, she made the final of the 200 meter backstroke.

References

Eyglo Osk Gustafsdottir
Eyglo Osk Gustafsdottir
Living people
Eyglo Osk Gustafsdottir
Swimmers at the 2012 Summer Olympics
Swimmers at the 2016 Summer Olympics
Icelandic female backstroke swimmers
Eyglo Osk Gustafsdottir
1995 births
20th-century Icelandic women
21st-century Icelandic women